The Milwaukee Brewers of 1891 were an American professional baseball team. They were brought into the major-league American Association (AA) from the minor-league Western Association in August 1891 to replace the Cincinnati Kelly's Killers, who had ceased operations on August 17. After the season, the AA folded, while the Brewers lasted one season in the Western League before they folded.

Regular season

Season standings

Record vs. opponents

Roster

Player stats

Batting

Starters by position 
Note: Pos = Position; G = Games played; AB = At bats; H = Hits; Avg. = Batting average; HR = Home runs; RBI = Runs batted in

Other batters 
Note: G = Games played; AB = At bats; H = Hits; Avg. = Batting average; HR = Home runs; RBI = Runs batted in

Pitching

Starting pitchers 
Note: G = Games pitched; IP = Innings pitched; W = Wins; L = Losses; ERA = Earned run average; SO = Strikeouts

Other pitchers 
Note: G = Games pitched; IP = Innings pitched; W = Wins; L = Losses; ERA = Earned run average; SO = Strikeouts

References 
1891 Milwaukee Brewers at Baseball Reference

Milwaukee Brewers season